Brandon Calver (born April 17, 1993) is a professional Canadian football linebacker for the Toronto Argonauts of the Canadian Football League (CFL).

University career
Calver played U Sports football for the Wilfrid Laurier Golden Hawks from 2013 to 2017. He played in 36 regular season games where he had 210.5 tackles, 11.5 sacks, four forced fumbles, six fumble recoveries, and one interception. He won a Yates Cup championship with the Golden Hawks in 2016.

Professional career

Montreal Alouettes
While eligible for the 2017 CFL Draft, Calver was not drafted and finished his university eligibility with the Golden Hawks in 2017. On January 22, 2018, it was announced that he had signed with the Montreal Alouettes as an undrafted free agent. Calver made the team's active roster following training camp and played in his first professional game on June 16, 2018, against the BC Lions, where he recorded one special teams tackle. He played in 17 regular season games that year where he had nine special teams tackles and one forced fumble.

In 2019, he played in five of the team's first six games of the season and recorded four special teams tackles. However, after the team signed fellow linebacker, Frédéric Plesius, Calver was released on August 5, 2019.

Ottawa Redblacks
On August 20, 2019, Calver signed with the Ottawa Redblacks to a practice roster agreement. He played in one game for the Redblacks, on August 24, 2019, against the Saskatchewan Roughriders, but was then released on August 31, 2019.

Winnipeg Blue Bombers
Soon after his release from Ottawa, Calver signed a practice roster agreement with the Winnipeg Blue Bombers on September 6, 2019. He played in the team's last five regular season games, but did not record a statistic. He did, however, record one special teams tackle in his playoff debut in the team's West Semi-Final win over the Calgary Stampeders. He was on the injured list for the West Final and Grey Cup games, but was still a member of the 107th Grey Cup championship team.

Calver remained under contract with the Blue Bombers in 2020, but did not play that year due to the cancellation of the 2020 CFL season. He became a free agent upon the expiration of his contract on February 9, 2021.

Toronto Argonauts
Calver remained unsigned to start the 2021 CFL season, but was signed in week 2 by the Toronto Argonauts on August 10, 2021.

References

External links
Toronto Argonauts bio

1993 births
Living people
Canadian football linebackers
Montreal Alouettes players
Ottawa Redblacks players
Players of Canadian football from Ontario
Sportspeople from London, Ontario
Toronto Argonauts players
Wilfrid Laurier Golden Hawks football players
Winnipeg Blue Bombers players